Serdyukov is a Russian masculine surname, its feminine counterpart is Serdyukova. Notable people with the surname include: 

Alex Serdyukov (born 1980), Russian mixed martial artist
Anastasiya Serdyukova (born 1997), Uzbekistani rhythmic gymnast
Anatoliy Serdyukov (born 1962), Russian politician and businessman
Andrey Serdyukov (born 1962), Russian general, commander of the Russian Airborne Troops
Sergei Serdyukov (born 1981), Russian football player
Valery Serdyukov (born 1945), Russian politician

Russian-language surnames